Indian Face is a  rhyolite rock climbing route on the "Great Wall" of the East Buttress of Clogwyn Du'r Arddu, in Wales.  When English climber Johnny Dawes completed the first free ascent of the route on 4 October 1986, it was graded E9 6c (5.13a X), the first-ever E9-graded route, and was considered one of the hardest traditional climbing routes in the world.  

Indian Face is still considered one of the world's most intimidating traditional climbs, and even decades after its first ascent, it is rarely repeated.  The ascent was an historic moment in the transition from traditional climbing as the dominant form of extreme rock climbing (in Britain, and elsewhere), to the safer form of sport climbing, which became the main focus for the leading climbers.

History

Clogwyn Du'r Arddu has long been considered a "crucible" of British traditional climbing, with many of Britain's leading climbers creating iconic routes on its buttresses; and the most challenging section is the sheer and imposing "Great Wall" on the East Buttress.

In 1980, enigmatic British climber and artist, John Redhead, who freed Britain's first-ever E7-graded route, The Bells The Bells (E7 6c), attempted to onsight a new route on the blanker right-hand side of "Great Wall".  After a number of very serious, and nearly fatal falls, he later abseiled down to drill a bolt at his high point of 80-feet, and called this route Tormented Ejaculation, and left it ungraded. 

In 1983, British climber Jerry Moffatt chopped the bolt while abseiling; and then climbed past it, but avoided the blanker groove to the left (what would later become Indian Face), and veered right to create Master's Wall, which he graded E7 6b. Moffatt found the climb terrifying, later saying: "At that time to be respected, you really had to be putting up really scary new routes. That was where it was at, in Britain at least. Master's Wall is probably where I risked most."

In 1984, Redhead repeated Master's Wall and told the authors of Welsh Rock (1986) that he felt Tormented Ejaculation was the crux of Master's Wall, and ".. the placement of the bolt was solely to protect moves leftwards into the finest unclimbed groove on the Great Wall [Indian Face] and NOT to go right [Master's Wall] which was merely an escape." In 1984, Redhead freed Margins of the Mind (E8 6c), further left of Master's Wall, which is considered the first-ever E8-grade.

On 4 October 1986, Johnny Dawes followed up the first half of Master's Wall, but before the (then removed) bolt of Tormented Ejaculation, entered the lefthand groove to make the first free ascent of Indian Face, the first-ever E9-graded rock climbing in Britain.  Dawes' ascent of Indian Face was considered to be the hardest and most dangerous traditional route in the world, and his feat was reported by the wider non-climbing media.  The 1989 guidebook described it as: "A pitch of such appalling difficulty as to be almost beyond the realms of human comprehension".  In 2011, Dawes said: "As you set off it's best to consider yourself already dead. You just do it". 

Shortly after Dawes' ascent, a key flake came loose while John Redhead was cleaning the route. Redhead presented the flake to Dawes, who refused it, and Redhead painted a picture of dueling climbers on the scarred rock that the broken flake had left behind.  The event caused an uproar in British climbing, and the painting was removed, and repairs were made to the rock face.  Redhead was openly critical of the "headpointing" techniques employed by Dawes, Moffat, and other ascensionists, notwithstanding criticisms of his own placement of a bolt in at Clogwyn.

Dawes' ascent, his rivalry with Redhead, and the repeats, are the subject of documentaries, including E9 6c (1997), Johnny Dawes and the Story of Indian Face (2006), and Return to the Indian Face (2011).

Legacy

Indian Face retains an intimidating reputation amongst climbers.  In 2012, Climbing described it as  "Indian Face, E9 6c, 150 feet of technical, 5.13a death".
The 2013 North Wales Climbs guidebook says: "Indian Face has established itself as the route of the 1980s. Seven repeats in the quarter of a century since it was first climbed and no onsight ascent, despite routes with bigger E-grades receiving more attention, tells you all you need to know." In 2004, Nick Dixon said of his first repeat ascent in 1994: "The upper wall is really hard, the gear now too far away, death real and looming, and it's too much to remember"; and Neil Grimes said of his second repeat, also in 1994: "For a split second of complete tranquility, I actually don't mind giving in. I resign myself to defeat and prepare for the unimaginable".  In 2020, Britain's strongest climber, Steve McClure, who had climbed Rhapsody (E11 7a), said: "Routes like Harder Faster, Indian Face, The Bells The Bells and Meshuga just fill me with dread, and I have absolutely no drive to do them at all."

Indian Face marked the twilight of traditional climbing as the main focus for the best British climbers; many were moving to sport climbing, with pre-fixed bolts for climbing protection.  Jerry Moffatt, and climbing partner Ben Moon, would abandon traditional climbing and set major new worldwide grade milestones in sport climbing, becoming two of the world's strongest climbers of the late 1980s to early 1990s.  Dawes was unwilling to undertake the intensive plyometric training techniques (e.g. the campus board) that Moffatt and Moon adopted, but he would still free further iconic traditional climbs, such as Gaia (E8 6c), End of the Affair (E8 6c) and The Quarryman (E8 7a).  Climbers like Dave MacLeod would create even-harder traditional climbs, such as Rhapsody in 2006, the world's first-E11, but the focus on traditional climbing had forever passed to sport climbing and bouldering.

Ascents

Indian Face has been ascended by:

 1st Johnny Dawes, 4 October 1986.
 2nd Nick Dixon 1994
 3rd Neil Gresham 1994 (a few days after Nick Dixon)
 4th Dave MacLeod 2010
 5th James McHaffie 2013
 6th Calum Muskett 2013 (same day)
 7th George Ullrich 2013 (same day)
 8th Angus Kille 2018

Filmography

 Short documentary on the rivalry between John Redhead and Johnny Dawes on the Indian Face: 

 Documentary on Johnny Dawes' 1986 ascent of Indian Face: 

 Short documentary on Dave MacLeod's 2010 repeat of Indian Face:

Notes

See also
History of rock climbing
Hubble, E9 7b sport climbing route at Raven Tor, Peak District, England
Master's Edge, E7 6c traditional climbing route at Millstone Quarry, Peak District, England

References

Further reading

External links
VIDEO: Johnny Dawes and the Story of Indian Face: the UK's First E9 Climb, Climbing (June 2020)
VIDEO: Dave MacLeod, Indian Face E9, Desnivel (April 2019)
The Day I Sent Indian Face, Angus Kille (Evening Sends, November 2018)
PREVIEW: North Wales Climbs (2013). Clogwyn Du'r Arddu, (Rockfax Guidebooks, pages 135-235)

Climbing routes
Cliffs of Snowdonia